This is a list of the instructions in the instruction set of the Common Intermediate Language bytecode.
  Opcode abbreviated from operation code is the portion of a machine language instruction that specifies the operation to be performed.
 Base instructions form a Turing-complete instruction set.
 Object model instructions provide an implementation for the Common Type System.

See also 
 Common Intermediate Language is the assembly language that uses the instruction set.
 Common Language Infrastructure is the standard in which the Common Intermediate Language is defined.
 .NET Framework is a platform and implementation of the Common Language Infrastructure.
 Mono is a cross-platform open-source implementation of the Common Language Infrastructure.

References 
 CIL Instruction Set at C# Online.NET (CSharp-Online.NET)
 ECMA - CIL Instruction Set - Page 321 (ECMA-335.pdf)

Common Language Infrastructure
Instruction set listings